The Ankeny Building is an historic structure located in downtown Clinton, Iowa. Chicago architect Harold Holmes designed the building in the Art Deco style. It was built by Daniel Haring in 1931. The exterior is covered with cream-colored terra cotta panels. The windows on the second floor are examples of the Chicago school and they are composed of steel and glass. It was listed on the National Register of Historic Places in 2006.

References

Commercial buildings completed in 1931
Art Deco architecture in Iowa
Buildings and structures in Clinton, Iowa
Commercial buildings on the National Register of Historic Places in Iowa
National Register of Historic Places in Clinton County, Iowa
Chicago school architecture in Iowa